The Japanese Institute of Certified Public Accountants (JICPA) is the sole organization for the CPA profession in Japan. It was originally formed in 1949 as a self-regulatory association, and reorganized under the Certified Public Accountants Act in 1966. In order to practice as a CPA, a qualified person must register with the JICPA and join its membership. In this way the JICPA may effectively guide and supervise its members and maintain close contact with them for the maintenance of a strong and independent organization. The JICPA, through its various committees and project teams, carries out a wide range of activities from self-regulation to the provision of services to its members.

References

Professional associations based in Japan
Organizations established in 1949
1949 establishments in Japan
Member bodies of the International Federation of Accountants